The Dorna Free Bird is an Iranian light-sport aircraft, designed and produced by Hava Faza Dorna Co. of Hasanabad. The aircraft is supplied complete and ready-to-fly.

Design and development
The Free Bird was designed to comply with the US light-sport aircraft rules. It features a cantilever low-wing, an enclosed  cabin with two-seats-in-side-by-side configuration accessed by doors, fixed tricycle landing gear, with wheel pants and a single engine in tractor configuration.

The aircraft structure is made entirely from composite material, with the fuselage a monocoque design. It has a low-mounted horizontal stabilizer with a single spar. Both the seats and the rudder pedals are adjustable for pilot height. The standard engine used is the Austrian  Rotax 912ULS, four-stroke powerplant, driving a Czech-built Woodcomp three-bladed, ground adjustable propeller.

As of February 2017, the design does not appear on the Federal Aviation Administration's list of approved special light-sport aircraft.

Specifications (Free Bird)

See also
Dorna Blue Bird

References

External links

Free Bird
2010s Iranian ultralight aircraft
Light-sport aircraft
Single-engined tractor aircraft